52 (fifty-two) is the natural number following 51 and preceding 53.

In mathematics
Fifty-two is 
 the 5th Bell number, the number of ways to partition a set of 5 objects. 
 a decagonal number. 
 an untouchable number, since it is never the sum of proper divisors of any number, and it is a noncototient since it is not equal to x − φ(x) for any x.
 a vertically symmetrical number.

In science
The atomic number of tellurium

Astronomy
Messier object M52, a magnitude 8.0 open cluster in the constellation Cassiopeia, also known as NGC 7654.
The New General Catalogue object NGC 52, a spiral galaxy in the constellation Pegasus.

In other fields

Fifty-two is:
The approximate number of weeks in a year. 52 weeks is 364 days, while the tropical year is 365.24 days long. According to ISO 8601, most years have 52 weeks while some have 53.
A significant number in the Maya calendar
On the modern piano, the number of white keys (notes in the C major scale)
The number of cards in a standard deck of playing cards, not counting Jokers or advertisement cards
The name of a practical joke card game 52 Pickup
52 Pick-Up is a film starring Roy Scheider and Ann Margaret
The code for international direct dial phone calls to Mexico
A weekly comic series from DC Comics entitled 52 has 52 issues, with a plot spanning one full year.
The New 52 is a 2011 revamp and relaunch by DC Comics of its entire line of ongoing monthly superhero books.
The number of letters in the English alphabet, if majuscules are distinguished from minuscules
The number of the French department Haute-Marne
 52nd Street (disambiguation)
52 Hand Blocks, a variant of the martial art jailhouse rock.
52 is the car number of retired NASCAR driver Jimmy Means
52 American hostages were held in the Iran hostage crisis
The number of the laps of the British Grand Prix since 2010.

Historical years
52 BC, AD 52, 1052, 1952 etc.

See also

 B52 (disambiguation)
 List of highways numbered 52

References 

Integers